Hubert Lyman Clark (January 9, 1870 – July 31, 1947) was an American zoologist. The son of Professor William Smith Clark, he was born at Amherst, Massachusetts, and educated at Amherst College and Johns Hopkins University.

From 1899 to 1905 he was professor of biology at Olivet College. Beginning in 1905, Clark worked as assistant in invertebrate zoology at the Museum of Comparative Zoology at Harvard University. He was curator of echinoderms from 1910 to 1927, and curator of marine invertebrates and associate professor of zoology beginning 1927. He was awarded the Clarke Medal by the Royal Society of New South Wales in 1947.

Work

He carried on scientific investigations in Jamaica, Bermuda and  Australia, where he collected in 1913, 1929 and 1932, and published many papers dealing with birds, snakes, echinoderms and flowers. His publications include:

The Birds of Amherst and Vicinity (1887)
The Echinoderms of Porto Rico (1901)
A New Ophiuran from the West Indies (1910)
North Pacific Ophiurans in the Collection of the United States National Museum (1911)
The echinoderm fauna of Australia (1946) (recording all known species including fossils)

He contributed to the New International Encyclopaedia and the Dictionary of American Biography.

References

External links
 

1870 births
1947 deaths
Amherst College
American zoologists
Amherst College alumni
Johns Hopkins University alumni
Harvard University staff
Harvard University faculty
People from Amherst, Massachusetts
Writers from Cambridge, Massachusetts
American nature writers
American male non-fiction writers